Core Knowledge (CK) refers to a current textbook series originally written by a collective of former top Year 12 South Australian students of the same name (2003–2008) for South Australian Certificate of Education (SACE) students. The Core Knowledge group was the first student collective of its type and magnitude in Australia, recruiting top students from 13 schools across South Australia since 2003. Unlike other similar resources, the Core Knowledge subject guides incorporated a unique student perspective, earning praise from the Australian National Innovation Council in 2005 and students and reviewers from South Australia, Victoria, NSW, Singapore, Malaysia and Indonesia. As of 2007, the resources available include Maths Studies, Biology, Physics and Chemistry subject guides.

Writers include former top students from Annesley College, Eynesbury Senior College, Glenunga International High School, Marryatville High School, Norwood Morialta High School, Prince Alfred College, Pembroke School, Rostrevor College, Sacred Heart College Senior, St Michael's College, St Peter's College, Westminster School and Wilderness School.

Executive members (2003–08): Yingda Li, Qiang Liu, Foo Lum, Duncan McLennan, Adrian Ting, Lilian Yan and George Young.

As of August 2008, Core Knowledge became the sole property of Fresnel Learning Pty Ltd, previous finalists in the Adelaide University e-business competition.

External links
Official Core Knowledge website

References 

Education in South Australia